Hometown is a 2021 South Korean television series starring Yoo Jae-myung, Han Ye-ri and Uhm Tae-goo. It aired on tvN from September 22 to October 28, 2021.

Synopsis
Set in 1999, Hometown is about a bizarre murder in a small town. It finds the truth of a recording tape containing mysterious serial killings.

Cast

Main
 Yoo Jae-myung as Choi Hyung-in, a veteran violent crime detective with fifteen years of experience who is living in misery after losing his wife to a horrific terrorist crime.
 Han Ye-ri as Jo Jung-hyun, Kyung-ho's sister who lives with the social stigma of being a terrorist's family. Ironically, her life was destroyed by her brother's crime but it was reconstructed through his daughter.
 Song Ji-hyun as young Jo Jung-hyun
 Uhm Tae-goo as Jo Kyung-ho, a convicted terrorist who is sentenced to life in prison for committing a gas attack in the town's train station in 1989.

Supporting

People around Hyung-in
 Kim Sae-byuk as Im Se-yoon, Hyung-in's wife.
  as Im In-gwan, Hyung-in's father-in-law.
 Song Young-chang as Yang Won-taek, Hyung-in's boss.
  as Lee Si-jeong, a passionate detective with four years of experience.
 Tae In-ho as Son Ji-seung, a prosecutor.

People around Jung-hyun
 Lee Re as Jo Jae-young, Kyung-ho's daughter who is a middle school student. She is living with her aunt Jung-hyun, but suddenly disappears.
  as Kim Kyung-sook, Kyung-ho's mother and Jae-young's grandmother.
 Lee Hae-woon as Jung Young-seop, Jung-hyun's classmate and head of the editorial department of Gyeongcheon High School.
 Kim Jung as Jung Min-jae, Jung-hyun's classmate and member of the editorial department of Gyeongcheon High School.
 Cha Rae-hyung as Kang Yong-tak, Jung-hyun's classmate and member of the editorial department of Gyeongcheon High School.
 Kim Ye-eun as Choi Kyung-joo, Jung-hyun's best friend since high school.

Gyeongcheon Girls' Middle School students
 Heo Jung-eun as Moon Sook, Jae-young's best friend.
 Park Si-yeon as Production Director Jung
 Park Seo-jin as DJ Han
 Kim Ji-an as Lee Kyung-jin

Others
 Kim Shin-bi as Kim Hwan-gyu, a Chinese restaurant employee who lives an honest life after leaving a bad past behind.
 Yoo Seong-ju as Pastor Woo
 Kim Soo-jin as Jung Min-sil

Production
The series was first announced to be aired on OCN. It was also included on OCN's promotional video for its 2021 line-up. However, in July 2021, it was confirmed that it would air on tvN instead.

Viewership

Note

References

External links
  
 
 

Korean-language television shows
TVN (South Korean TV channel) television dramas
Television series by Studio Dragon
Television series by C-JeS Entertainment
South Korean mystery television series
South Korean thriller television series
2021 South Korean television series debuts
2021 South Korean television series endings